Ewell West railway station is one of two stations in Ewell (in the Epsom and Ewell district) in Surrey, England. The station is served by South Western Railway.

From 1905 to 1950 there was a connection to the Horton Light Railway which had been built to transport building materials to the cluster of hospitals in the Horton Lane area.

Ewell West has been in Travelcard Zone 6 since 2007.

Services 
All services at Ewell West are operated by South Western Railway using  EMUs.

Until 2022, Class 456 trains were often attached to Class 455 units to form ten carriage trains, but these were withdrawn on 17th January with the introduction of a new timetable.

The typical off-peak service in trains per hour is:
 2 tph to  via 
 1 tph to 
 1 tph to 

The same service is provided on Sundays and bank holidays.

See also 
 Ewell East railway station

References

External links 

Railway stations in Surrey
Transport in Epsom and Ewell
Former London and South Western Railway stations
Railway stations in Great Britain opened in 1859
Railway stations served by South Western Railway